Stadion Rohonci Út was a multi-purpose stadium in Szombathely, Hungary.  It was home to Szombathelyi Haladás. The stadium was able to hold 12,500 people and was built in 1923. It hosted the hammer throw events for the IAAF World Athletics Final as the Stade Louis II in Monaco is too small.

History

Demolition
On 19 January 2016, the seats were removed from the old stadium. Some of these seats were purchased by the club's supporters and the rest was acquired by smaller clubs based in Vas County.

On 23 February the flood lights were demolished.

Gallery

References

External links
Stadion Rohonci Út at magyarfutball.hu

Rohonci Ut
Multi-purpose stadiums in Hungary
Szombathelyi Haladás
Buildings and structures in Szombathely
Sports venues demolished in 2016
Sports venues completed in 1923
1923 establishments in Hungary
2016 disestablishments in Hungary